Báguanos is a municipality and town in the Holguín Province of Cuba.

Geography
The municipal territory includes several villages: the most populated one is Tacajó, with a population of 11,273.

Demographics
In 2004, the municipality of Báguanos had a population of 54,854.

See also
List of cities in Cuba
Municipalities of Cuba

References

External links

Populated places in Holguín Province